Peter Burling is a Democratic former member of the New Hampshire Senate, representing the 5th District since 2006.

Career 
Previously he was a member of the New Hampshire House of Representatives from 1988 through 1994, and 1996 through 2004.

Burling announced in May 2008 he would not be running for the Senate in 2008. However, he will serve as a member of the Democratic National Committee, as he was recently elected to a four-year term.

References

External links
The New Hampshire Senate - Senator Peter Burling official NH Senate website
Project Vote Smart - Senator Peter Hoe Burling (NH) profile
Follow the Money - Peter Hoe Burling
2006 2004 Senate campaign contributions
2002 2000 1998 House campaign contributions
New Hampshire Senate Democratic Caucus - Peter Burling profile

New Hampshire state senators
Members of the New Hampshire House of Representatives
1945 births
Living people
Harvard College alumni
Harvard Law School alumni